Graham Grace (born 16 August 1975) is a South African cricketer. He played in 39 first-class and 24 List A matches from 1996 to 2004. Grace also played for Marylebone Cricket Club in 2015 during their tour to South Africa.

References

External links
 

1975 births
Living people
South African cricketers
Eastern Province cricketers
North West cricketers
Marylebone Cricket Club cricketers
Sportspeople from Harare